Pasi Lauren (born 14 December 1968) is a Finnish judoka. He competed in the men's half-lightweight event at the 1996 Summer Olympics.

Achievements

Pasi Lauren is also a maestro of Argentinian Tango, teaching all over the world. He spends a lot of time in Buenos Aires each year.

References

External links
 

1968 births
Living people
Finnish male judoka
Olympic judoka of Finland
Judoka at the 1996 Summer Olympics